The 2022 Grand Prix of Espoo was the sixth event in the 2022–23 ISU Grand Prix of Figure Skating, a senior-level international invitational competition series. It was held at the Espoo Metro Areena in Espoo from November 25-27. It was the replacement event for Rostelecom Cup. Medals were awarded in the disciplines of men's singles, women's singles, pairs, and ice dance. Skaters also earned points toward qualifying for the 2022–23  Grand Prix Final.

Entries 
The International Skating Union announced the preliminary assignments on July 22, 2022.

Changes to preliminary assignments

Results

Men

Women

Pairs

Ice dance

References

External links 
 Grand Prix of Espoo at the International Skating Union
  
 Results

2022 in figure skating
2022 in Finnish sport
Grand Prix of Espoo